Sorokina is a genus of fungi in the family Dermateaceae. The genus contains 6 species.

The genus was circumscribed by Pier Andrea Saccardo in Syll. Fung. vol.10 on page 42 in 1892.

The genus name of Sorokina is in honour of Nikolai Vasilevich Sorokin (1846–1909), who was a Russian botanist, Mycologist, Microbiologist  and Parasitologist. He was Professor of Botany and Director of the Botanical Garden of the Kazan Federal University.

Species
As accepted by Species Fungorum;
 Sorokina blasteniospora 
 Sorokina bogoriensis 
 Sorokina caeruleogrisea 
 Sorokina frondicola 
 Sorokina insignis 
 Sorokina lignicola 
 Sorokina microspora 
 Sorokina tjibodensis 
 Sorokina uleana

See also
 List of Dermateaceae genera

References

External links
Sorokina at Index Fungorum

Fungi described in 1892
Dermateaceae genera
Taxa named by Pier Andrea Saccardo
Helotiales